ONE Fight Night 10: Johnson vs. Moraes 3 is an upcoming Combat sport event produced by ONE Championship that will take place on May 5, 2023, at the 1stBank Center in Broomfield, Colorado, United States.

Background 
The event will mark the promotion's first event hosted in the United States and will be broadcast live on Amazon Prime Video. Colorado was chosen for the US debut because its athletic commission was the first to approve ONE's rule set.

A ONE Flyweight World Championship trilogy bout between current champion Demetrious Johnson (also former UFC Flyweight Champion and 2019 ONE Flyweight World Grand Prix Champion) and Adriano Moraes is expected to headline the event. The pairing first met at ONE on TNT 1 on April 7, 2021, where Moraes won by knockout in the second round. Their second meeting took place at ONE on Prime Video 1 on August 27, 2022 where Johnson won by knockout in the fourth round.

A ONE Flyweight Muay Thai World Championship bout between current champion Rodtang Jitmuangnon and Edgar Tabares is expected to take place at the event.

A ONE Flyweight Submission Grappling World Championship bout between current champion Mikey Musumeci and Osamah Almarwai is expected to take place at the event.

A middleweight bout between former ONE Middleweight and Light Heavyweight World Champion Aung La Nsang and Fan Rong is expected to take place at the event. The pairing was previously scheduled to meet at ONE Fight Night 6, but Rong withdrew due to tested positive for COVID-19.

A submission grappling superfight was scheduled for the event featuring current ONE Middleweight Champion Reinier de Ridder (also former ONE Light Heavyweight World Champion) and ADCC bronze medallist Tye Ruotolo.

Fight card

See also 

 2023 in ONE Championship
 List of ONE Championship events
 List of current ONE fighters

References 

Events in Broomfield, Colorado
ONE Championship events
2023 in mixed martial arts
Mixed martial arts in Colorado
Sports in Colorado
Sports in Broomfield, Colorado
2023 in sports in Colorado
May 2023 sports events in the United States
Scheduled mixed martial arts events